is a JR West San'in Main Line railway station located in Hōhoku, Shimonoseki, Yamaguchi Prefecture, Japan. It is one of the stations on the Misuzu Shiosai Experience, which takes place on certain trains during the day between Nagatoshi and Hatabu.

Station layout
The station was originally designed as a single entry station capable of serving three tracks across two platforms, however the third track was withdrawn and separated from the mainline, leaving just the two tracks. For that reason, the station layout was set so that trains travelling in each direction would stop at their respective platforms. The entrance to the station's building is on platform 1, while access to platform 2 can be made via an uncovered footbridge. There is a waiting room on each platform.

The station is run by the Nagato Railroad Bureau. There are no members of staff at the station on Mondays, though there is a computerized ticket machine with a touchscreen monitor.

History
 16 August 1925 - The extension of the Japanese National Rail Kogushi Line, as it was then known, from Kogushi Station, is completed. Takibe Station became the new final stop and began servicing customer as well as freight trains.
 9 September 1928 - The Kogushi Line is extended to Agawa Station.
 24 February 1933 - The Kogushi Line is incorporated into the San'in Main Line.
 1 March 1972 - The service of freight trains is cancelled.
 1 April 1987 - Under the privatisation of Japan's railways, Takibe Station becomes part of the West Japan Railway Company.
 1 April 2008 - Takibe switches to a simpler ticket system.

The construction of the San'in Main Line was the final link in connecting the trainlines in the area during the Taishō period. At the time, the plan was to have the entire line along the Sea of Japan's coastline, but in line with the wishes of the region's residents, as well as to keep the project in budget, Takibe Station and Kottoi Station were located inland.

In the era of JNR, the first train to Shimonoseki Station from Takibe Station was a local train that departed at 3:29am. With the exception of designated night trains, this was the earliest first departure anywhere in Japan.

Platforms

Lines
The following lines pass through or terminate at Takibe Station:
West Japan Railway Company
San'in Main Line

Adjacent stations

Local Area
 Takibe Post Office
 Shimonoseki City Branch Office (Hōhoku)
 Hōhoku Senior High School
 Hōhoku Junior High School
 Takibe Elementary School
 Shimososeki Special Products Centre
 Hōhoku General Sports Park
 Takibe Hospital
 Takibe Onsen
 Ichinomata Onsen
 Hōhoku Historical Folk Museum (Former main building of Takibe Elementary School)
 The Repputowa Stone Monument
 Mōri Hidekane's Grave

Bus Line 
 Blue Line Bus Service
Service to Tsunoshima via Kottoi Station and Tsunoshima Bridge.
Service to Toyota.

User statistics
Below are the average number of people who alight at Takibe Station per day.
 1999 - 400
 2000 - 393
 2001 - 368
 2002 - 351
 2003 - 328
 2004 - 310
 2005 - 280
 2006 - 304
 2007 - 311
 2008 - 304
 2009 - 290
 2010 - 266
 2011 - 250

References

External links
 JR West station information 

Railway stations in Japan opened in 1925
Railway stations in Yamaguchi Prefecture
Sanin Main Line
Stations of West Japan Railway Company